The 2014 Hollywood Casino 400 was a NASCAR Sprint Cup Series race that was held on October 5, 2014, at Kansas Speedway in Kansas City, Kansas. Contested over 267 laps on the 1.5–mile (2.4 km) oval, it was the 30th race of the 2014 Sprint Cup Series championship, and the fourth race in the Chase for the Sprint Cup. Joey Logano scored his fifth win of the season. Kyle Larson finished second while Kyle Busch, Martin Truex Jr. and Carl Edwards rounded out the top five. The top rookies of the race were Kyle Larson (2nd), Austin Dillon (8th), and Cole Whitt (23rd).

Previous week's race
Jeff Gordon took the lead on the final pit cycle and kept it to score his 92nd career win in the AAA 400 at Dover International Speedway. “I knew we could compete with the 2 car (Brad Keselowski),” Gordon said. “The 2 was really good on short runs but we could run them down. He made us work for it there at the end... He got to me and I was really, really tight in traffic there at the end, so I didn’t know if we were gonna pull it off.”

Report

Background
The Kansas Speedway is a 1.5 miles (2.4 km) tri-oval race track in Kansas City, Kansas. The speedway was built in 2001 and currently hosts two annual NASCAR race weekends. The IndyCar Series also raced at the speedway until 2011. The speedway is owned and operated by International Speedway Corporation.

Practice and qualifying
The first three weeks we have led a bunch of laps and qualified well. Last week had them covered and a valve stem got knocked off by a lug nut. Keep doing the things that you are doing and that luck will all come full circle and as long as the cars continue to be fast that stuff all comes back to you. Hopefully it peaks at the right time.” "I'm pretty happy to be in the top five, that's better than where we started in May," said Gordon. “Sixth isn't bad; we were 17th in practice, but we have to keep working on it,” said Keselowski. “This is probably our weakest track in Chase." Kurt Busch spun his car exiting turn 4 and got stuck in the grass. He was forced to go to a backup car and will start last. Alex Bowman will also start last after tagging the wall in turn 4 and rolling out the backup car.

Race

The race was scheduled to begin at 2:16 PM Eastern time, but it started six minutes late when Kevin Harvick led the field to the green.

Jamie McMurray took the lead from Harvick on lap 44.

McMurray surrendered the lead on lap 47 to pit and handed the lead to Jeff Gordon.

Gordon surrendered the lead the next lap to pit. Brad Keselowski assumed the lead.

Keselowski pitted on lap 49 and McMurray cycled back to the lead on lap 50.

Caution flew for the first time on lap 71 for debris in turn 4. Jamie McMurray and Kevin Harvick traded the lead on pit road with the No.1 car pitting before the start/finish line. He took the lead back from Harvick.

The race restarted on lap 76. Greg Biffle about spun the car out exiting turn 2, but managed to save it. Dale Earnhardt Jr. took the lead.

Caution flew for the second time on lap 79 when Kurt Busch slammed the wall in turn 4.

The race restarted on lap 84. McMurray tapped the right rear corner panel of Jeff Gordon and he kissed the wall exiting turn 4.

A multi-car crash on the backstretch brought out the third caution of the race on lap 85. It started when Greg Biffle rear-ended Jimmie Johnson, who clipped Justin Allgaier in the process, and sent him into the inside wall. Allgaier continued down and collected Josh Wise. "Obviously a big hit in Chase points," Johnson said. "Puts a lot of pressure on us next week and the week after. We've got to be on our game at Charlotte and Talladega."

The race restarted on lap 91.

Dale Earnhardt Jr. was leading the race when the right-front tire blew and sent him into the wall exiting turn 4 bringing out the fourth caution of the race on lap 122. "The tire came apart going through the corner," said Earnhardt Jr., who was shooting for his third straight top 10 at Kansas. "We were running along there. I really wasn't pushing the car that hard and I had a real big lead so I was just backing the corner up and letting the car turn. Going into (Turn) 3 the tread of the tire came all the way off." Joey Logano took the lead as a result.

The race restarted on lap 128 and Kevin Harvick retook the lead.

Logano took the lead back from Harvick on lap 135.

Caution flew for the fifth time on lap 160 when Brad Keselowski blew a right-front and slammed the wall in turn 2. Kasey Kahne took just two tires and exited pit road first.

The race restarted on lap 165 and Kahne promptly lost the lead to Joey Logano.

Kevin Harvick retook the lead on lap 167 and Logano took it right back the next lap.

Caution flew for the sixth time on lap 190 after Joey Gase rear-ended the wall in turn 3. Harvick exited pit road as the leader.

The race restarted on lap 196.

Joey Logano retook the lead on lap 198.

Caution flew for the seventh time with 38 laps to go after Greg Biffle slammed the wall in turn 4. Ryan Newman took only two tires and won the race off pit road.

The race restarted with 33 laps to go.

The eighth caution flew with 32 laps to go after Kasey Kahne hit the wall in turn 2. "Something happened to my tire," Kahne said. "I was just about ready to crash and got it to pit road before it blew. Then we got back out and I lost the back of it and clipped the wall. We had a top three car before that. We really did."

The race restarted with 28 laps to go, Newman lost the lead to Joey Logano and he held off a hard-charging Kyle Larson to score his fifth win of the season. “It was a crazy race, and I had such a fast Pennzoil Ford," said Logano. It is awesome to be back in victory lane. When the top opened up, the car just took off. Me and the No. 42 (Kyle Larson) were the only ones that seemed to be able to run up there. We had a cat and mouse (with Larson) during portions of the late run. I just had to be able to work the traffic and keep my momentum up. We just have to keep capitalizing going forward.” “The easiest approach is to go to Charlotte and win,’’ Keselowski said. “The bad side of this Chase is we took a big points lead in here and gave it all back to zero. The good side of it is that you can still win your way out of it, and we have two really good tracks for us ahead. If we can just win at one of them, we will be fine. Maybe if we have two really good finishes we will be fine. That is the good side.”

Results

Qualifying

Race results

Race statistics
 25 lead changes among different drivers
 8 cautions for 34 laps
 Time of race: 2 hours, 49 minutes and 17 seconds
 Average speed: 
 Joey Logano won his fifth race in 2014

Standings after the race

Drivers' Championship standings

Manufacturers' Championship standings

Note: Only the first sixteen positions are included for the driver standings.

Note

References

Hollywood Casino 400
Hollywood Casino 400
Hollywood Casino 400
NASCAR races at Kansas Speedway